Haßberge Nature Park is a park of  located in the north east of Franconian Keuperland in Bavaria, Germany.

Isolated castles and ruins
The park has a large number of isolated castles and ruins which are integrated into the park's well marked walking paths.

See also 
List of nature parks in Germany

References

External links 
 Naturpark Haßberge website

Nature parks in Bavaria
Haßberge (district)